Apollo Faye (born December 11, 1951 in Dakar, Senegal) is a French basketball player. Faye has had 80 selections on the French national men's basketball team from 1979 to 1985.

External links
 http://archive.fiba.com/pages/eng/fa/player/p/pid/64709/sid/2259/tid/282/tid2//_/1983_European_Championship_for_Men/index.html

French men's basketball players
French sportspeople of Senegalese descent
Living people
1951 births
Limoges CSP players
Montpellier Paillade Basket players
Apollo
20th-century French people